Terlinden is a noble family of the Kingdom of Belgium with origins in Germany (14th century) and established in the Spanish Netherlands around 1580. Their titles are Viscounts and Barons.

Belgian noble families
German noble families